Pseudojana clemensi is a moth in the family Eupterotidae. It was described by Schultze in 1910. It is found in the Philippines (Mindanao).

References

Moths described in 1910
Eupterotinae
Insects of the Philippines